Levosalbutamol, also known as levalbuterol, is a short-acting β2 adrenergic receptor agonist used in the treatment of asthma and chronic obstructive pulmonary disease (COPD). Evidence is inconclusive regarding the efficacy of levosalbutamol versus salbutamol or salbutamol-levosalbutamol combinations, though levosalbutamol is believed to have a better safety profile due to its more selective binding to β2 receptors (primarily in the lungs) versus β1 (primarily in  heart muscle).

The drug is the (R)-(−)-enantiomer of its prototype drug salbutamol. It is available in some countries in generic formulations from pharmaceutical companies including Cipla, Teva, and Dey, among others.

Medical use 
Levosalbutamol's bronchodilator properties give it indications in treatment of COPD (chronic obstructive pulmonary disease, also known as chronic obstructive lung disease) and asthma. Like other bronchodilators, it acts by relaxing smooth muscle in the bronchial tubes, and thus shortening or reversing an acute "attack" of shortness of breath or difficulty breathing. Unlike some slower-acting bronchodilators, it is not indicated as a preventative of chronic bronchial constriction.

Comparison to salbutamol 
A 2013 systematic review of the drug's use as a treatment for acute asthma found that it "was not superior to albuterol regarding efficacy and safety in subjects with acute asthma." The review concluded: "We suggest that levalbuterol should not be used over albuterol for acute asthma." Levalbuterol is notably more costly.

Adverse effects
Generally, levosalbutamol is well tolerated. Common mild side-effects include an elevated heart rate, muscle cramps, and gastric upset (including heartburn and diarrhea).

Symptoms of overdose in particular include: collapse into a seizure; chest pain (possible precursor of a heart attack); fast, pounding heartbeat, which may cause raised blood pressure (hypertension); irregular heartbeat (cardiac arrhythmia), which may cause paradoxical lowered blood pressure (hypotension); nervousness and tremor; headache; dizziness and nausea/vomiting; weakness or exhaustion (medical fatigue); dry mouth; and insomnia.

Rarer side effects may indicate a dangerous allergic reaction. These include: paradoxical bronchospasm (shortness of breath and difficulty breathing); skin itching, rash, or hives (urticaria); swelling (angioedema) of any part of the face or throat (which can lead to voice hoarseness), or swelling of the extremities.

Pharmacology

Mechanism of action 
Activation of β2 adrenergic receptors on airway smooth muscle leads to the activation of adenylate cyclase and to an increase in the intracellular concentration of 3',5'-cyclic adenosine monophosphate (cyclic AMP). The increase in cyclic AMP is associated with the activation of protein kinase A, which in turn, inhibits the phosphorylation of myosin and lowers intracellular ionic calcium concentrations, resulting in muscle relaxation.

Levosalbutamol relaxes the smooth muscles of all airways, from the trachea to the terminal bronchioles. Increased cyclic AMP concentrations are also associated with the inhibition of the release of mediators from mast cells in the airways. Levosalbutamol acts as a functional agonist that relaxes the airway irrespective of the spasmogen involved, thereby protecting against all bronchoconstrictor challenges.

While it is recognized that β2 adrenergic receptors are the predominant receptors on bronchial smooth muscle, data indicate that there are beta receptors in the human heart, 10–50% of which are β2 adrenergic receptors. The precise function of these receptors has not been established. However, all β adrenergic agonist drugs can produce a significant cardiovascular effect in some patients, as measured by pulse rate, blood pressure, and restlessness symptoms, and/or electrocardiographic (ECG).

Approval and names 
Levosalbutamol is the INN while levalbuterol is the USAN.

Levalbuterol was approved in the United States as a solution to be used with a nebulizer device in March 1999 and in March 2015 became available in a formulation with a metered-dose inhaler under the trade name Xopenex HFA (levalbuterol tartrate inhalation aerosol).

See also
 Salbutamol — the racemic mixture containing both (R)-(−)- and (S)-(+)-enantiomers

References

External links 
 

Beta2-adrenergic agonists
Chemical substances for emergency medicine
Enantiopure drugs
Phenylethanolamines
Phenols